Angel of the Winds Arena (originally known as Everett Events Center) is a multi-purpose sports arena complex in Everett, Washington, United States, designed and developed by the Everett Public Facilities District. It opened in October 2003 and primarily serves as the home of the Everett Silvertips of the Western Hockey League. The arena has 8,149 seats in its ice hockey configuration and 10,000 for concerts and other events. The naming rights to the venue were sold to Comcast in 2007 and subsequently to Angel of the Winds Casino Resort in 2017. The venue has hosted a variety of concerts and other performances, including the Ringling Brothers Circus, Disney on Ice, the Harlem Globetrotters, and Sesame Street Live.

The venue also hosted 2008 Skate America, a three-day ice-skating championship featuring world-class skaters. The events were both nationally and internationally televised on NBC. It was the first event of six in the 2008-2009 ISU Grand Prix of Figure Skating, a senior-level international invitational competition. This was Skate America's largest attendance ever recorded in its history.

History

Construction on the arena began in April 2002 and was completed in late 2003 at a cost of $71.5 million. The Everett Events Center hosted its first Western Hockey League game on October 8, 2003. The new arena booked several events that had traditionally used the Tacoma Dome, including Disney on Ice and the Harlem Globetrotters.

Tenants and events

In 2016, the arena served as the host for the 2016 Pacific Rim Gymnastics Championships. It also hosted WWE's flagship TV show Monday Night Raw on February 17, 2020.

Hockey

Angel of the Winds Arena is the home of the Everett Silvertips, a Western Hockey League franchise. In their first season (2003–04), the Everett Silvertips won the WHL Western Conference Championship.

The arena also hosted a preseason game between the National Hockey League's Seattle Kraken and Edmonton Oilers on October 1, 2021.

Basketball

The Seattle Storm of the Women's National Basketball Association announced that it would play five home games during its 2019 season in Everett, while the rest are played at their temporary home in Seattle, the Hec Edmundson Pavilion on the University of Washington campus. The Storm played their season opener in Everett on May 25, 2019, using the same floor that had previously been installed at KeyArena. The team planned to return in 2020 for eight games in Everett, but due to the COVID-19 pandemic, all WNBA games were moved to Bradenton, Florida.

The Storm played all 16 home games of their 2021 season at Angel of the Winds Arena with up to 2,000 fans allowed to attend per the state's COVID-19 reopening guidelines.

Curling

In 2017, the arena, then known as Xfinity Arena, was host to the USA Men's and Women's Curling National Championships. The men's championship was won by 2018 Winter Olympics gold medalists Team John Shuster, while Team Jamie Sinclair captured the women's crown.

Banked track roller derby

Angel of the Winds Arena is also home to the Tilted Thunder Rail Birds, a Seattle-based, all-female, banked track roller derby league.

Tennis 
On February 7–8, 2020 Angel of the Winds Arena hosted USTA Fed Cup qualifying event with competing teams USA and Latvia.

Rodeo

The PBR's premier bull riding tour, the Unleash the Beast Series, made its first-ever stop in Everett for an event at the arena on April 6, 2022.

Other uses

On April 1, 2020, the arena opened as a COVID-19 quarantine center with 150 beds amid the coronavirus pandemic. The quarantine center was meant for patients with COVID-19 and are unable to self-isolate or quarantine at home.

Former tenants

The arena was also home to the International Basketball League's Everett Explosion for one season in 2007 before they moved to Monroe and were renamed the Snohomish County Explosion, where they played until 2010. Comcast Arena also hosted arena football for three years (2005–07). The Everett Hawks were a primary football tenant in the arena for the NIFL in their first season at Everett, going undefeated at 14–0, but lost in the playoff semifinal to the Tri-Cities Fever. The team switched to af2 in 2006 and became a minor-league team where they didn't find much success, which led to their folding in 2007.

In 2012, Comcast Arena was the home of the now-defunct Everett Raptors of the Indoor Football League.

Lacrosse

In 2010, Comcast Arena became home to the Washington Stealth of the National Lacrosse League.  The franchise was previously known as the San Jose Stealth, and before that the Albany Attack. After four seasons in Everett, the Washington Stealth were relocated to British Columbia in 2014.

Conference Center

The Edward D. Hansen Conference Center is a three-story addition to the arena that cost US$12 million to construct. The facility includes a  ballroom that is capable of accommodating 800 guests. In addition to the ballroom, the conference center has three executive meeting rooms available as private meeting space. The conference center hosts approximately 200 events annually. It is also home to a public art collection, which includes artwork from the Pilchuck Glass Collection.

Ice rink
The Xfinity Community Ice Rink is an NHL regulation 200' x 85' ice rink that is located inside Angel of the Winds Arena. It is a public ice skating rink, which is used for public skating, local hockey leagues, figure skating, instructional sessions, and much more.  Currently the rink is open year-round, and has the versatility to transform into a  space with the capability to host trade shows, expositions, consumer shows and special events.

Concerts

References

External links

Buildings and structures in Everett, Washington
Indoor arenas in Washington (state)
Indoor ice hockey venues in the United States
Indoor lacrosse venues in the United States
Sports venues in Washington (state)
Western Hockey League arenas
Tourist attractions in Everett, Washington
Sports in Everett, Washington
Sports venues completed in 2003
2003 establishments in Washington (state)
Basketball venues in Washington (state)